The club is the first soccer representative of the first port of Peru, Callao, which laid the foundations for future Chalacos clubs, going from being a school club to being a professional club, gaining recognition, prestige and trust among fans of the Callao, from Lima and Peru, since today there are many clubs with the name of Atlético Chalaco, but only one is the original and traditional. [At present, Atlético Chalaco is called the "Historical Soccer Heritage of the Constitutional Province of Callao ".

He has several championships won at the district, regional and national level. In 1918 he obtained recognition as a national champion when he beat the team of the nascent Peruvian Football League, which he defeated by 2 to 1. He has been champion of the First Division of Peru on two occasions: 1930 and 1947. And he also has four runners-up. nationals those of 1948, 1957, 1958 and 1979.

His classic and historic rival is Sport Boys, with whom he plays the Clásico Porteño as both clubs are from the Callao region, and are the most successful clubs in the famous Peruvian port. It also had rivalries with the Lima clubs, with which the Lima-Callao classics were born, among them was the Association Football Club, which would later merge with the Club Unión Ciclista Peruana, to form the Ciclista Lima Association club, a club that is its successor. And he not only wears the colors of his jersey, but also the nickname of Dean for his predecessor, who was the first Peruvian soccer club. Also with Alianza Lima with which he played the old classic Lima-Callao. Fierce encounters that delineated the cultural and social boundaries of Lima and Chalacos.

His clothing is legendary, as it has the white and red colors that the Peruvian soccer team would later have. Through the ranks of "León Porteño", great players and scorers passed that nurtured and formed the character of Peruvian football, such as Telmo Carbajo, Claudio Martínez Bodero, Alfonso Saldarriaga, Enrique Salas, Antonio Maquilón, Manuel Puente, José Arana, Humberto Crescimbeni, René Rosasco, Domingo Raffo, Félix Mina, Carlos Torres, Andrés Bedoya, Óscar Arizaga, Augusto Prado.

The club played for long periods at the Telmo Carbajo stadium until its discontinuation due to the inauguration of the Miguel Grau stadium. The old model stadium later named in honor of the greatest idol of Atlético Chalaco, Telmo Carbajo, was always the stronghold of the chalaca fury that every day could be heard rumbling with a loud voice "chalaco fury", chalaco fury ". Currently the Chalaco has returned to train at his home, the Telmo Carbajo stadium.

The club also participates in junior, youth and master football tournaments.

History
The club was founded on 9 June 1902 by young students of the Instituto Chalaco in the Marco Polo Nº 19 street, house of the captain Mr. Federico Rincón, father of one of the student founders. His first President was Cesar Rivera, who at the same time was the captain of the team and he was appointed like Honorary President to August Cazorla, director of the institute. Very fast the club conquer the affection of the Callao leaving indelible testimonies through many generations who won the triumphs that helped the contact and development of the town. He is known popularly as the León Porteño and the "Decano del Futbol Porteño".

Its debut was a 24 September of the year 1902, facing to the Sport Victoria, winning Chalaco for 1–0. Little by little went emphasizing among the clubs of the Callao of that epoch beginning to compete against the Lima clubs in some encounters that even they finished in pitched battle. The first National Olympic was carried out by the year 1917, and in the Championship was imposed as unbeaten, obtaining as prize a great shield that was exhibited in its old localities of the (Today Av. Sáenz Peña) counting in its rows with some of the most representative players of the epoch as Telmo Carbajo and Claudio Martínez.

On 7 September 1924, forming a combined with the club Unión Buenos Aires, rout to the Uruguayan selection for 1 to 0, in a historic match set against the Uruguayans. They emphasized in said match the players: Enrique Álvarez, Alfonso "El sereno" Saldarriaga, Antonio Maquilón, Faustino Mustafich, José "Patuto" Arana, Enrique Salas, Félix Muñoz, Esteban Dagnino, Manolo Puente and Juan Sudman.

In 1928 it becomes the first Peruvian football team that travelled to Quillota, Chile, before the teams of San Luis, Santiago Wanderers, Colo-Colo and others, in order to curing injuries on the War of the Pacific between both countries and of 8 matches that maintains with the main teams, alone loses one in his début front upon Colo-Colo.

In 1930, the club crowned Primera División champion after beating Alianza Lima 2–1 in the last round, with the following line-up: Enrique Álvarez; P.Ureta, Martínez, Enrique Salas, Juan Rivero, Faustino Mustafich, José Arana, Miñán, Miguel Rostaing, Manolo Puente, Miguel Arana.

In 1947, after a great campaign and under the presidency of Mario Chiabra, the Atlético Chalaco, be consecrated again National Champion, they participated in said championship under the direction of the coach "Patuto" Arana the following players: Humberto Becerra, Eliseo Moral, Rene Rosasco, Juan Lecca, Félix Mina, "Perejil" Reynaldo Luna, Ernesto "Chicha" Morales, Guillermo Aguilar, Luis Rodriguez, Domingo Raffo (captain), Carlos Torres, Juan "Cartucho" Castillo. Also they participated Juan Alcazar, Francisco Viacava, Julio Navarrete, Armando Agurto, Bejar and Leon.

In 1948 they were national Sub-Champions, in that year they travelled to Guayaquil, Ecuador after a brilliant campaign they returned unbeaten.

In the 1950s the team earned the nickname 'Ballet Porteño' by its good play emphasizing the Paraguayan goalkeeper Adolfo Riquelme, Andrés Bedoya, Sabino Bártoli, Luis Portanova, Jacinto Villalba, Germán Colunga, Rene Rosasco, Felix Mina, Santiago Armandola, Gualberto Bianco, Antonio Aguiar and Luis López. In that decade the club achieved the subchampionships of the 1957 and 1958. The first one lost it before the Centro Iqueño and in the following one defined in a Clasico Porteño in last date before its rival neighbor the Sport Boys, to which surpassed in the board by a point, but could not celebrate that classic therefore fell defeated by 1 to 0 and consequently lost the National Title.

In 1962 it entered a phase of economic difficulties that carried it to lose the category descending to play in the Second Division where was maintained until 1965, when descends to the First Amateur in the League of the Callao.

After an intense fight by recovering its seat of honor, in 1971 was champion in the League of the Callao and upon winning the home run of the Interligas to the teams of Lima elevates to the Second Division. In 1972, including Alberto "Toto" Terry as the coach, champion in the Second Division after winning for 2 – 1 to the Porvenir Miraflores achieving the ascent to the First Division. The Callao entire dressed of festival with the triumph of the Chalaco and its return to the top division of Peruvian football.

In 1979, with the technical direction of Cesar Cubilla, the club of Callao was runner-up and is classified to represent to Peru in the Copa Libertadores 1980 next to the team of the Sporting Cristal facing to the teams champions from Argentina the River Plate and the Vélez Sársfield. Of that staff they emphasized Fernando Apolinario, Augusto Prado, Oscar Arizaga, Victor Benavides, Javier Chirinos and Alberto Castillo. The year 1985 remains last in the Metropolitan tournament and descends. Since then, carried out irregular campaigns in the League of the Callao.

In 1987 it could return to the first division although the team lost via penalty shoot-out to Guardia Republicana. In recent years the León Porteño assembled good teams and advanced in the Peru Cup, but failed to surpass the Regional phase of the versions 2000, 2002, 2005 and 2007.

15 October 2003, the new history for the club is written, the third penal room of justice of the Callao, returns to the historic club to the port next to its supporters after 20 years of arduous fight, this process had its fruit therefore in a very slow lethargy after 10 "committee of recovery" the last one that achieved this great feat, was the headline by.

In the 2008 it is elected president Alex Kouri, doing an important investment to achieve the title of the Peru Cup and the ascent to First Division, nevertheless again only he would arrive to the Regional Phase where would be eliminated by the Union Supe that defeated it in both matches. 18 February 2009 Kouri renounced the presidency, taking on the job in a temporary way Abelardo D´Angelo Cobos.

Rivalries
Atlético Chalaco has had a long-standing rivalry with Sport Boys.

Stadium
They played their home games in Estadio Telmo Carbajo.

Honours

National
Peruvian Primera División: 
Winners (2): 1930, 1947
Runner-up (4): 1948, 1957, 1958, 1979

Peruvian Segunda División:
Winners (1): 1972
Runner-up (1): 1971

Regional
Liga Departamental del Callao:
Winners (4): 2000, 2002, 2005, 2008
Runner-up (2): 2001, 2006

Liga Provincial del Callao:
Winners (5): 1932, 1934, 1935, 1966, 1970

Liga Distrital del Callao:
Winners (11): 1992, 1996, 1997, 2000, 2001, 2004, 2005, 2007, 2008, 2012, 2022
Runner-up (3): 2002, 2009, 2013

Performance in CONMEBOL competitions
Copa Libertadores: 1 appearance
1980: First Round

See also
List of football clubs in Peru
Peruvian football league system

External links

 

Football clubs in Peru
Association football clubs established in 1902